A lock ring is a threaded washer used to prevent components from becoming loose during rotation. They are found on an adjustable bottom bracket and a track hub of a bicycle.

Lokring is another form of fastener used in the automotive and air condition industries: these fittings are often confused with lockrings.

See also

References 

Fasteners
Bicycle parts